Shahid Zeyn-o-ddin Metro Station is a station in line 3 of the Tehran Metro.  It is located next to the interchange of Sayyad Expressway and Zeinoddin Expressway. And it has been named so as a memorial name for Mehdi Zeinoddin who was one of Iranian major generals during Iran-Iraq war.

See also 
 Mehdi Zeinoddin

References

Tehran Metro stations
Railway stations opened in 2015
2015 establishments in Iran